Barry Beard (21 December 1941 – 9 June 2001) was an Australian cricketer. He played two first-class matches for Tasmania between 1974 and 1975.

See also
 List of Tasmanian representative cricketers

References

External links
 

1941 births
2001 deaths
Australian cricketers
Tasmania cricketers
Cricketers from Tasmania